Marco Siverio Toro (born 4 October 1994) is a Spanish professional footballer who plays as a forward for Austrian Regionalliga side FC Juniors OÖ.

Career statistics

Club

References

External links
Profile at the Delaware Fightin' Blue Hens website
Profile at the Horn website

1994 births
Living people
People from Tenerife
Sportspeople from the Province of Santa Cruz de Tenerife
Spanish footballers
Association football forwards
SV Horn players
FC Juniors OÖ players
2. Liga (Austria) players
Spanish expatriate footballers
Expatriate footballers in Austria